Vanilla roscheri is a species of flowering plant in the family Orchidaceae found in Kenya, Somalia, Mozambique, Tanzania, Ethiopia, and South Africa.

References

External links

roscheri
Orchids of Africa
Orchids of South Africa
Flora of Ethiopia
Flora of Kenya
Flora of Mozambique
Flora of Somalia
Flora of Tanzania